Younus Qanooni (born on 10 May 1957 in Panjshir Valley) is an Afghan politician who was Vice President of Afghanistan. An ethnic Tajik, Qanooni is the leader of the Afghanistan e Naween (New Afghanistan) political party and former Speaker of the House of the People (the lower house of parliament or Wolesi Jirga).

Biography

Following the Soviet Intervention of Afghanistan in 1979, Qanooni joined with the mujahideen force led by Ahmad Shah Massoud based in his native Panjshir Valley. A protégé of Massoud, he was involved in the creation of the Afghan Northern Alliance and served as Interior Minister in Burhanuddin Rabbani's government. After the assassination of Massoud in 2001, a trio consisting of Qanooni, Defence Minister Mohammed Fahim and Foreign Minister Dr Abdullah took de facto control of the Northern Alliance and its financial resources.

Political career

The United States backed the Northern Alliance with air support in Afghanistan in 2001. In 2001, Qanuni served as chief negotiator for the Afghan Northern Alliance delegation to the Bonn conference on Afghanistan in Bonn, Germany.

Immediately after the fall of the Taliban government, Qanuni was interior minister in an interim administration. He was eventually made the education minister in the Afghan Transitional Administration (established in June 2002), and served as a security advisor to interim President Hamid Karzai. Along with Fahim and Abdullah, Qanuni was seen as one of the dominant figures of the Transitional Administration

Elections for a permanent government were scheduled for 2004. When Qanuni's ally Mohammed Fahim was passed over as vice-presidential running mate of Karzai, Qanuni entered the race for the presidency himself. On October 5, 2004, Qanuni's campaign supporter, Abdul Aziz, was assassinated while in Shindand, Afghanistan.

In the election, held October 9, 2004, he placed second to Karzai. On December 23, 2004, the newly inaugurated Karzai announced his administration, and both Qanuni and Fahim were dropped from their Ministerial posts.

Qanuni was elected in the 2005 Afghan Parliamentary elections, placing second in the Kabul province. Since the Presidential election he has generally been seen as the spokesman of the formerly powerful Tajik ethnic group, which dominated the Northern Alliance and the Transitional Afghan Administration, but was largely sidelined after the 2004 Presidential Election. As well as his own party, Qanuni has formed an alliance of several parties called the Jabahai Tafahim Millie or National

On December 21, Qanuni was chosen to lead the 249-seat lower house of parliament with 122 votes against 117 for his closest challenger, Abdul Rasul Sayyaf.

In August 2021, he was part of an Afghan delegation to Pakistan, after the Taliban took control of the country again.

Quotes

External sources

Biography: Mohammad Yunis Qanuni
Profile: Yunus Qanuni; BBC; 9/10/2004

See Also
Hasib qoway markaz
Din mohammad jurat
Ahmad massoud

References

Vice presidents of Afghanistan
1957 births
Afghan Tajik people
Living people
New Afghanistan Party politicians
People from Panjshir Province
Speakers of the House of the People (Afghanistan)